The Quambalariaceae are a family of fungi in the class Exobasidiomycetes. The family contains the single genus Quambalaria, which in turn contains five species. Quambalaria was circumscribed in 2000 to accommodate plant pathogenic species—previously classified in Ramularia and Sporothrix—that were known to infect Corymbia trees in Australia, causing a leaf spot and shoot blight  and canker disease.

References

External links

Queensland Government Quambalaria shoot blight

Ustilaginomycotina
Basidiomycota genera